is a 2010 Japanese comedy film directed by Koji Fukada.

Cast
Kenji Yamauchi
Kiki Sugino
Kanji Furutachi
Kumi Hyōdo
Tatsuya Kawamura
Bryerly Long
Hiroko Matsuda
Eriko Ono
Haruka Saito
Naoki Sugawara

Reception
Ben Sachs of Chicago Reader called Hospitalité a "charming comedy", while Chris Cabin of Slant Magazine called it "Essentially timeless".

Maggie Lee of The Hollywood Reporter said that the film is "bizarre" and compared disguised Japanese xenophobia as a "house intruder" motif to that of Yoshimitsu Morita's Family Game and Max Frisch's play The Fire Raisers.

Ronnie Scheib of Variety was quoted saying that "[the film] maintains a marvelous tension between a prim comedy of manners and unbridled slapstick".

References

External links

2010 comedy films
Japanese comedy films
2010s Japanese-language films
2010s Japanese films